The Kakanui River is a river of North Otago, New Zealand, bridged by Highway 1 at Maheno and flowing into the Pacific Ocean at Kakanui.

See also
List of rivers of New Zealand

References

Rivers of Otago
Rivers of New Zealand